The Barretts of Wimpole Street is a 1957 British CinemaScope drama historical film originating from the United Kingdom, and was a re-make of the earlier 1934 version by the same director, Sidney Franklin. Both films are based on the 1930 play The Barretts of Wimpole Street by Rudolf Besier. The screenplay for the 1957 film is credited to John Dighton, although Franklin used exactly the same script for the second movie as he did for the first. The film, set in the early 19th century, stars Jennifer Jones, John Gielgud, and Bill Travers.

Plot
Elizabeth Barrett (Jennifer Jones) is the disabled grown-up daughter of Edward Moulton-Barrett (John Gielgud) of Wimpole Street, and has an intense interest in poetry. However, she lives under the obsessive rule of her father, and this severely limits her ability to develop her love of rhyme amongst her peers. Edward in fact shows clear incestuous tendencies towards her, and discourages close contact with any males. When the poet Robert Browning (Bill Travers) enters her life, though, matters are brought to a head, through the intervention of Browning. Edward finds that his control over Elizabeth, and her younger sister Henrietta (Virginia McKenna), is far from complete.

Cast

 John Gielgud as Edward Moulton-Barrett
 Jennifer Jones as Elizabeth Barrett
 Bill Travers as Robert Browning
 Virginia McKenna as Henrietta Barrett
 Vernon Gray as Captain Surtees Cook
 Susan Stephen as Bella
 Jean Anderson as Wilson
 Maxine Audley as Arabel
 Leslie Phillips as Harry Bevan
 Laurence Naismith as Dr. Chambers
 Moultrie Kelsall as Dr. Ford-Waterlow
 Michael Brill as George
 Kenneth Fortescue as Octavius
 Nicholas Hawtrey as Henry
 Richard Thorp as Alfred
 Keith Baxter as Charles
 Brian Smith as Septimus

Production

Development 
To lend the whole project an air of authenticity, producer Sam Zimbalist moved filming from the 1934 location in the United States to the Metro-Goldwyn-Mayer studios in Borehamwood, Hertfordshire, England.

Casting
Zimbalist wanted only "fine English actors" with the exception of American actress Jennifer Jones. The cast included Bill Travers (Browning) and Virginia McKenna (Henrietta), though cast to play future in-laws in the film, were actually husband and wife in real life.

Filming
The production wanted to use as
many correct locations as possible, including St Marylebone Parish Church in London.

The film was shot in Metrocolor, using CinemaScope, with an aspect ratio of 2.35:1 on 35mm film. The 4-track stereo sound was supplied by Westrex.

Release
The film was an expensive financial failure. According to MGM records, it earned $330,000 in the U.S. and Canada, and $725,000 in other countries, resulting in a loss of $1,897,000.

Reception
Reviews were generally positive, although several critics questioned the decision to remake the film at that time because of its lack of appeal to the rock and roll generation. Bosley Crowther of The New York Times praised the film as "another fine production of the old romance ... It does one's heart good to visit once more that dramatic old house on Wimpole Street."

Variety wrote that the film had "a quality look, perfectly picturing the era with almost museum fidelity and reflecting astuteness in virtually all phases except possibly the most important—choice of story for the current, highly competitive market." The review thought that younger viewers would find the film "no more than a quaint, old-fashioned, boy-meets-girl drama, long, talky and often tedious."

Harrison's Reports agreed, calling the film "a quality production" but "extremely slow-moving, and the morals and manners of the period, as presented, may prove much too stately for today's mass audiences." Richard L. Coe of The Washington Post declared the film "an excellent remake of an old favorite" with a "chilling, memorable performance" by Gielgud.

A generally positive review in The New Yorker by John McCarten called the script a "fair and literate adaptation" of the play and Mr. Barrett "an impressive figure" as played by Gielgud, "but I'm afraid I can't say as much for Jennifer Jones, who plays the invalid Elizabeth as if she'd just completed a lively hay ride, or for Bill Travers, whose Browning is unconscionably ebullient." The Monthly Film Bulletin remarked that the decision to remake the film seemed "rather odd," given that to modern viewers it "must appear a little tame and lacking in spirit. In any case, the handling of Rudolf Besier's heavily dramatic play reveals little flair or imagination; the film is far too static and theatrically manoeuvered to maintain the interest throughout its considerable running time."

Historical accuracy 
Although most of the names of the individuals involved are correct in the play and films, by definition motivations of individuals cannot be known. The numerous love letters that Robert and Elizabeth exchanged before their marriage, however, can give readers a great deal of information about this famous courtship in their own words. The correspondence was well underway before they ever met in person, he having admired the collection Poems that she published in 1844. He opens his first letter to her, 'I love your verses with all my heart, dear Miss Barrett,' and a little later in that first letter he says 'I do, as I say, love these books with all my heart—and I love you too' (10 January 1845).

Several editions of these letters have been published, starting with one by their son in 1898. Flush by Virginia Woolf, a version of the courtship from the perspective of Elizabeth's dog, is also an imaginative reconstruction, though more closely based on reading the letters. Both the play and film reflect popular concerns at the time, particularly Freudian analysis. Although Edward Barrett's behaviour in disinheriting the children who married seems bizarre, there is no evidence of his being sexually aggressive toward any family members.

See also
 List of British films of 1957

References

External links
 
 
 
 

1957 films
British biographical drama films
Films set in the 19th century
Films directed by Sidney Franklin
Metro-Goldwyn-Mayer films
Films shot in England
British remakes of American films
Robert Browning
1950s biographical drama films
Films set in London
1950s historical drama films
British historical drama films
Films scored by Bronisław Kaper
Biographical films about writers
1950s English-language films
1950s British films